Exploration Peak is a small peak in the unincorporated town of Enterprise, Nevada, United States in the planned community of Mountain's Edge just south of State Route 160 (Blue Diamond Road). It is located within the eponymous Exploration Peak Park.

Etymology
Exploration Peak is named for its proximity to the Old Spanish Trail.

Hiking and recreation
Part of Exploration Peak Park, the peak is easily accessed by two main trails, the  Exploration Peak Trail and the  Exploration Peak Loop, and features an overlook at the summit.

References

Mountains of Nevada
Mountains of Clark County, Nevada